Sadistic Intent is a death metal band from Los Angeles.

Biography
After the demise of Los Angeles, California's Devastation, which formed in 1986, Sadistic Intent began in 1987. The band quickly changed its line-up, then released a few rehearsal tapes and in early 1989 released the Conflict Within demo, which the band pushed and distributed through the international underground scene. Eventually Sadistic Intent signed with a rising label, Wild Rags Records. In 1990, the Impending Doom EP was released and a few tours followed in Mexico as well as the United States. The following year, after bitter disputes with the label, they moved on and self-released a limited edition (1,000 copies) 7-inch EP A Calm Before The Storm. Due to line-up problems, the band would not do any live appearances until 1993.

In 1994, Sadistic Intent recorded the Resurrection MCD (released through Gothic Records, the re-press would then be done by Dark Realm Records in 1995) with bassist Bay Cortez singing for the first time. After sorting out another line-up problem in 1996, they recorded a tribute song to Celtic Frost for Dwell Records. In 1997, they then released Ancient Black Earth as a limited edition (500 hand-numbered copies) MCD through their own record label, Dark Realm Records. In 1998, a split 7-inch EP with the German black metal group Ungod was released through the German record label Merciless Records. 1999 saw more tribute recordings and releases from Sadistic Intent. One was for a Dwell Records tribute to Los Angeles metal band Slayer and the other for California's Possessed, which featured original Possessed front man Jeff Becerra on vocals. By 2000, Sadistic Intent licensed its Resurrection of the Ancient Black Earth LP to Germany's Iron Pegasus Records, which also released the Morbid Faith 7-inch EP in 2002.

Eventually by 2007, Jeff Becerra asked Rick and Bay Cortez (the founding members of Sadistic Intent) if they would be interested in doing more Possessed songs and it was then when Becerra decided to call it Possessed, and Sadistic Intent became the members of that band from 2007 through 2010. After that split-up, in 2011 it was announced that drummer Nick Barker (Lock Up and Dimmu Borgir) had joined Sadistic Intent; however, logistically it became too difficult to take place. After taking care of that line-up change with the addition of current drummer Arthur Mendiola in 2011, the next Sadistic Intent release was recorded in 2013 and released in 2014 titled Reawakening Horrid Thoughts, a 12-inch laser-etched EP through Iron Pegasus Records.

Throughout the years, Sadistic Intent has toured in various countries around the world such as Norway, Brazil, Finland, Mexico, Germany, Chile, Holland, Italy, Switzerland, Denmark, Greece, Belgium, Australia, Singapore, France and the US.

Band members

Current
Bay Cortez – bass , vocals 
Rick Cortez– guitar 
Ernesto Bueno – guitar 
Arthur Mendiola – drums 

Former members
Enrique Chavez – vocals 
Joel Marquez - drums 
Carlos Gonzalez – guitar 
Vince Cervera – guitar 
Emilio Marquez – drums 
Nicholas Barker - drums 

Timeline

Dark Realm Records and store
Sadistic Intent is linked to the record label and record store Dark Realm Records in Downey, California, since the owners of the store, Bay Cortez and Rick Cortez, are both Sadistic Intent members. The store has been compared to the black metal gathering site and record store  in Norway. The record label of the same name has released Sadistic Intent's albums, as well as albums by Dark Angel, Pentacle, Witchmaster, and Draconis.

Discography
 Conflict Within (demo, 1989)
 Impending Doom (EP, 1990)
 A Calm Before the Storm (EP, 1991)
 Live at the Deathcave (demo, 1993)
 Resurrection (EP, 1994)
 Ancient Black Earth (EP, 1997)
 Eternal Darkness/Phallus Cult (split 7-inch EP, 1998)
 Resurrection of the Ancient Black Earth (Best-of compilation, 2000)
 Morbid Faith (EP, 2002)
 Reawakening Horrid Thoughts (12-inch MLP, 2014)
 Invocations of the Death-Ridden (split 12-inch, 2016)

External links
 

Death metal musical groups from California
Musical groups established in 1987
Musical groups from Los Angeles